The white-lipped snail or garden banded snail, scientific name Cepaea hortensis, is a medium-sized species of air-breathing land snail, a terrestrial pulmonate gastropod mollusc in the family Helicidae. It is a close relative of the Grove Snail.

Shell description 

Like the grove snail (brown-lipped snail), it has considerable variability in shell colour and banding, although the shell of the white-lipped snail is perhaps most commonly yellow, with or without brown banding. The principal distinguishing feature of this species is a white lip at the aperture of the shell in adult specimens, although very rarely the brown-lipped grove snail can have a white lip, and vice versa.

Distribution 
The native distribution of this species is Western Europe and Central Europe. The range of the white-lipped snail extends closer to the Arctic in Northern Europe than the range of the grove snail. The white-lipped snail has been introduced to northeastern parts of the USA, but has not established itself as successfully as the brown-lipped snail.

Habitat 
The two species share many of the same habitats, such as woods, dunes and grassland, but the white-lipped snail tolerates wetter and colder areas than the brown-lipped snail can.

Life cycle 
This species of snail creates and uses love darts during mating.

The size of the egg is 2 mm.

References

External links

Cepaea hortensis at Animalbase taxonomy, short description, distribution, biology, status (threats), images
 Cepaea hortensis images at Encyclopedia of Life
Images of shell variations in C. hortensis
Snail white - Images of shell variations in C. hortensis Thai language translate

Helicidae
Gastropods described in 1774